USS Columbia may refer to:

 , a 44-gun frigate under construction, was burned in 1814 to prevent her capture by the British
  was a 50-gun sailing frigate launched in 1836 and in occasional service until 1861, when she was burned to avoid capture by the Confederates
  was a captured Confederate screw steamer that ran aground in 1863
  was an ironclad, also captured from the Confederates in 1865 and in use until June of that year.
 , later CA-16, was a protected cruiser in service from 1894 to 1921.  At the end of its career it was renamed USS Old Columbia.
  was originally the Great Northern, a troop transport, renamed in 1921 and used until 1922
  was a light cruiser launched 17 December 1941 and active throughout the rest of World War II
 USS Columbia (AOT-182), a transport oiler, was returned to her owner on 1 May 1984
  is a  commissioned in 1995 and currently in active service

See also
 , future lead ship of the s, originally named Columbia, but changed so as not to conflict with 
 List of ships named SS Columbia
 Columbia Rediviva (1773) - privately owned American full-rigged ship
 The Command Module Columbia of Apollo 11
 Space Shuttle Columbia
  - several Canadian Navy ships
  -a United States privateer brig formally named Curlew captured by the Royal Navy

United States Navy ship names